Carthage Historic District may refer to the following places:
Carthage Historic District (Carthage, Mississippi), listed on the National Register of Historic Places
Carthage Historic District (Carthage, North Carolina), listed on the National Register of Historic Places